The president of Germany, officially the Federal President of the Federal Republic of Germany, is the head of state of Germany.

Under the 1949 constitution (Basic Law) Germany has a parliamentary system of government in which the chancellor (similar to a prime minister or minister-president in other parliamentary democracies) is the head of government. The president has far-reaching ceremonial obligations, but also the right and duty to act politically. They can give direction to general political and societal debates and have some important "reserve powers" in case of political instability (such as those provided for by Article 81 of the Basic Law). The president also holds the prerogative to grant pardons on behalf of the federation. The German presidents, who can be elected to two consecutive five-year terms, have wide discretion about how they exercise their official duties.

Under Article 59 (1) of the Basic Law (German Constitution), the president represents the Federal Republic of Germany in matters of international law, concludes treaties with foreign states on its behalf and accredits diplomats. Furthermore, all federal laws must be signed by the president before they can come into effect; presidents may veto a law if they believe it to violate the constitution.

The president's actions and public appearances represent the state itself, its existence, legitimacy, and unity. The president enjoys a higher ranking at official functions than the chancellor. The president's role is integrative and includes the control function of upholding the law and the constitution. It is a matter of political tradition – not legal restrictions – that the president generally does not comment routinely on issues in the news, particularly when there is some controversy among the political parties. This distance from day-to-day politics and daily governmental issues allows the president to be a source of clarification, to influence public debate, voice criticism, offer suggestions and make proposals. In order to exercise this power, they traditionally act above party politics.

The current officeholder is Frank-Walter Steinmeier who was elected on 12 February 2017 and re-elected on 13 February 2022. He is currently serving his second five-year-term, which began on 19 March 2022.

Election 

The president is elected for a term of five years by secret ballot, without debate, by a specially convened Federal Convention which mirrors the aggregated majority position in the Bundestag (the federal parliament) and in the parliaments of the 16 German states. The convention consists of all Bundestag members, as well as an equal number of electors elected by the state legislatures in proportion to their respective populations. Since reunification, all Federal Conventions have had more than 1200 members, as the Bundestag has always had more than 600 parliamentarians since then. It is not required that state electors are chosen from the members of the state legislature; often some prominent citizens are chosen.

The German constitution, the Basic Law, requires that the convention be convened no later than 30 days before the scheduled expiry of the sitting president's term or 30 days after a premature expiry of a president's term. The body is convened and chaired by the President of the Bundestag. From 1979 to 2009, all these conventions were held on 23 May, the anniversary of the foundation of the Federal Republic in 1949. The resignation of Horst Köhler in 2010, which necessitated an early meeting of the Federal Convention, brought this tradition to an end.

In the first two rounds of the election, the candidate who achieves an absolute majority is elected. If, after two votes, no single candidate has received this level of support, in the third and final vote the candidate who wins a plurality of votes cast is elected.

The result of the election is often determined by party politics. In most cases, the candidate of the majority party or coalition in the Bundestag is considered to be the likely winner. However, as the members of the Federal Convention vote by secret ballot and are free to vote against their party's candidate, some presidential elections were considered open or too close to call beforehand because of relatively balanced majority positions or because the governing coalition's parties could not agree on one candidate and endorsed different people, as they did in 1969, when Gustav Heinemann won by only six votes on the third ballot. In other cases, elections have turned out to be much closer than expected. For example, in 2010, Wulff was expected to win on the first ballot, as the parties supporting him (CDU, CSU and FDP) had a stable absolute majority in the Federal Convention. Nevertheless, he failed to win a majority in the first and second ballots, while his main opponent Joachim Gauck had an unexpectedly strong showing. In the end, Wulff obtained a majority in the third ballot. If the opposition has turned in a strong showing in state elections, it can potentially have enough support to defeat the chancellor's party's candidate; this happened in the elections in 1979 and 2004. For this reason, presidential elections can indicate the result of an upcoming general election. According to a long-standing adage in German politics, "if you can create a President, you can form a government."

Past presidential elections

Qualifications 
The office of president is open to all Germans who are entitled to vote in Bundestag elections and have reached the age of 40, but no one may serve more than two consecutive five-year terms. As yet (2022), only five presidents (Heuss, Lübke, von Weizsäcker, Köhler and Steinmeier (in office)) have been elected for a second term and only two of them (Heuss and von Weizsäcker) completed those terms, while Lübke and Köhler resigned during their second term. The president must not be a member of the federal government or of a legislature at either the federal or state level.

Oath 
After taking office the president must take the following oath, stipulated by Article 56 of the Basic Law, in a joint session of the Bundestag and the Bundesrat (it is the only event that demands such a joint session constitutionally). The religious references may optionally be omitted.

I swear that I will dedicate my efforts to the well-being of the German people, promote their welfare, protect them from harm, uphold and defend the Basic Law and the laws of the Federation, perform my duties conscientiously and do justice to all.  (So help me God.)

German constitutional law does not consider oaths of office as constitutive but only as affirmative. This means that the president does not have to take the oath at the moment of entering office in order to be able to exercise its constitutional powers. In practice, the oath is usually administered during the first days or weeks of a president's term on a date convenient for a joint session of the Bundestag and the Bundesrat. Nevertheless, in theory a persistent refusal to take the oath is considered to be an impeachable offence by legal scholars. If a president is re-elected for a second consecutive term, they do not take the oath again.

Duties and functions 

The president is involved in the formation of the Federal Government and remains in close cooperation with it. Basically, the president is free to act on his own discretion. However, according to Article 58 of the German constitution, the decrees, and directives of the president require the countersignature of the chancellor or the corresponding federal minister in charge of the respective field of politics. This rule ensures the coherence of government action, similar to the system of checks and balances in the United States. There is no need for a countersignature if the president proposes, appoints or dismisses the chancellor, convenes or dissolves the Bundestag according to Article 63, declares a legislative state of emergency, calls on a chancellor and ministers to remain in office after the end of a chancellor's term until a successor is elected or exercises his right to pardon on behalf of the federation, as these are exclusive powers of the president.

Therefore, the president also receives the chancellor regularly for talks on current policy issues. German presidents also hold talks with individual federal ministers and other senior officials at their own discretion. The "Head of the Office of the President" represents the will and views of the president in the meetings of the Federal Cabinet and reports back to the president.

The president's most prominent powers and duties include:

Proposing the chancellor to the Bundestag.
Appointing and dismissing the chancellor and their cabinet ministers
Dissolving the Bundestag under certain circumstances
Declaring the legislative state of emergency under certain circumstances
Convening the Bundestag
Signing and promulgating laws or vetoing them under certain circumstances
Appointing and dismissing federal judges, federal civil servants, and commissioned and non-commissioned officers of the Armed Forces
Exercising the power to pardon individual offenders on behalf of the Federation
Awarding honors on behalf of the Federation
Representing Germany at home and abroad

Appointment of the Federal Government 
After the constitution of every new elected Bundestag, which automatically ends the term of the chancellor, and in every other case in which the office of chancellor has fallen vacant (death or resignation), the president will propose an individual as chancellor and must then, provided the individual is subsequently elected by a majority of the members of the current Bundestag (the so-called Chancellor-majority) on the first ballot, appoint the elected candidate to office. However, the Bundestag is also free to disregard the president's proposal (which has, as of 2022, never happened), in which case the parliament must within 14 days elect another individual, whom the parties in the Bundestag now choose themselves, to the post with the same so-called Chancellor-majority, whom the president is then obliged to appoint. If the Bundestag does not manage to do so, on the 15th day after the first ballot the Bundestag must hold one last ballot: if an individual is elected with the Chancellor-majority, the president is also obliged to appoint the elected candidate. If no clear consensus was reached, the president can either appoint as chancellor the individual who received a plurality of votes on this last ballot or dissolve the Bundestag. The president can dismiss the chancellor, but only if and when the Bundestag passes a constructive vote of no confidence, electing a new chancellor with the Chancellor-majority at the same time. If this occurs, the president must dismiss the chancellor and appoint the successor elected by the Bundestag.

The president also appoints and dismisses the remaining members of the federal government upon proposal of the chancellor. This theoretically means that the president can appoint only those candidates presented by the chancellor. It is unclear whether the president could refuse to dismiss or appoint a federal minister proposed, as no president has ever done so.

In practice, the president only proposes a person as chancellor who has previously garnered a majority support in prior coalition talks and traditionally does not interfere in those talks. However, after the "Jamaica coalition" talks failed in the wake of the 2017 election, President Steinmeier invited several Bundestag party leaders to try to still bring them together to form a working government.

Other appointments 
The president appoints federal judges, federal civil servants, and military officers.

Dissolution of the Bundestag 
In case the Bundestag elects an individual for the office of chancellor by a plurality of votes, rather than a majority, on the 15th day of the election process, the president can, at his discretion, either appoint that individual as chancellor or dissolve the Bundestag, triggering a new election. If a vote of confidence is defeated in the Bundestag, and the incumbent chancellor proposes a dissolution, then the president may, at his discretion, dissolve the body within 21 days. As of 2022, this power has only been applied three times in the history of the Federal Republic. In all three occurrences, it is doubtful whether the motives for that dissolution were in accordance with the constitution's intentions. Each time the incumbent chancellor called for the vote of confidence with the stated intention of being defeated, in order to be able to call for new elections before the end of his regular term, as the Basic Law does not give the Bundestag a right to dissolve itself. The most recent occurrence was on 1 July 2005, when Chancellor Gerhard Schröder asked for a vote of confidence, which was defeated.

Promulgation of the law 
All federal laws must be signed by the president before they can come into effect. The president may refuse to sign the law, thus effectively vetoing it. In principle, the president has the full veto authority on any bill, but this, however, is not how past presidents handled their power. Usually, the president checks if the law was passed according to the order mandated by the Constitution and/or if the content of the law is constitutional. Only in cases in which the incumbent president had serious doubts about the constitutionality of a bill laid before him, he has refused to sign it. It also has to be stated that the president may at his own discretion sign such a "vetoed" bill at any later time, if for example the Basic Law has been changed in the relevant aspect or if the bill in question has been amended according to his concerns, because his initial refusal to sign a bill is not technically a final veto.

As yet (2022), this has happened only nine times and no president has done it more often than two times during his term:
In 1951, Theodor Heuss vetoed a bill concerning income and corporation taxes, because it lacked the consent of the Bundesrat (in Germany some bills at the federal level need the consent of the Bundesrat, and some do not, which can be controversial at times).
In 1961, Heinrich Lübke refused to sign a bill concerning business and workforce trades he believed to be unconstitutional, because of a violation of the free choice of job.
In 1969, Gustav Heinemann vetoed the "Engineer Act", because he believed this legislative area to be under the authority of the states.
In 1970, Gustav Heinemann refused to sign the "Architects Act" for the same reason.
In 1976, Walter Scheel vetoed a bill about simplification measures regarding the conscientious objection of conscription, because it lacked the – in his opinion necessary – consent of the Bundesrat.
In 1991, Richard von Weizsäcker refused to sign an amendment to the "Air Traffic Act" allowing the privatization of the air traffic administration, which he believed to be unconstitutional. He signed the bill later after the "Basic Law" was changed in this aspect.
In 2006, Horst Köhler vetoed a bill concerning flight control, because he believed it to be unconstitutional.
Later the same year, Horst Köhler vetoed the "Consumer Information Act" for the same reason.
In 2020, Frank-Walter Steinmeier refused to sign the "Hate Speech Act" because of concerns about its constitutionality. In a letter sent to the Bundesrat, he stated his intent to sign the bill, if accordingly amended in a reasonable time. He did so in April 2021.
Karl Carstens, Roman Herzog, Johannes Rau, Christian Wulff and Joachim Gauck have signed and promulgated all bills during their respective terms.

Foreign relations 
The president represents Germany in the world (Art. 59 Basic Law), undertakes foreign visits and receives foreign dignitaries. They also conclude treaties with foreign nations (which do not come into effect until affirmed by the Bundestag), accredit German diplomats and receive the letters of accreditation of foreign diplomats.

Pardons and honours 
According to Article 60 (2) of the German Constitution, the president has the power to pardon. This means the president "has the authority to revoke or commute penal or disciplinary sentences in individual cases. The federal president cannot, however, issue an amnesty waiving or commuting sentences for a whole category of offenses. That requires a law enacted by the Bundestag in conjunction with the Bundesrat. Due to the federal structure of Germany the federal president is only responsible for dealing with certain criminal matters (e.g. espionage and terrorism) and disciplinary proceedings against federal civil servants, federal judges, and soldiers".

It is customary that the federal president becomes the honorary godfather of the seventh child in a family if the parents wish it. He also sends letters of congratulations to centenarians and long-time married couples.

Legislative state of emergency 
Article 81 makes it possible to enact a law without the approval of the Bundestag: if the Bundestag rejects a motion of confidence, but a new chancellor is not elected nor is the Bundestag dissolved, the chancellor can declare a draft law to be "urgent". If the Bundestag refuses to approve the draft, the cabinet can ask the federal president to declare a "legislative state of emergency" (Gesetzgebungsnotstand) with regard to that specific law proposal.

After the declaration of the president, the Bundestag has four weeks to discuss the draft law. If it does not approve it the cabinet can ask the Federal Council for approval. After the consent of the Federal Council is secured, the draft law becomes law.

There are some constraints on the "legislative state of emergency". After a president has declared the state of emergency for the first time, the government has only six months to use the procedure for other law proposals. Given the terms provided by the constitution, it is unlikely that the government can enact more than one other draft law in this way.

Also, the emergency has to be declared afresh for every proposal. This means that the six months are not a period in which the government together with the president and the Federal Council simply replaces the Bundestag as lawgiver. The Bundestag remains fully competent to pass laws during these six months. The state of emergency also ends if the office of the chancellor ends. During the same term and after the six months, the chancellor cannot use the procedure of Article 81 again.

A "legislative state of emergency" has never been declared. In case of serious disagreement between the chancellor and the Bundestag, the chancellor resigns or the Bundestag faces new elections. The provision of Article 81 is intended to assist the government for a short time, but not to use it in crisis for a longer period. According to constitutional commentator Bryde, Article 81 provides the executive (government) with the power to "enable decrees in a state of emergency" (exekutives Notverordnungsrecht), but for historical reasons the constitution avoided this expression.

Politics and influence 

Though candidates are usually selected by a political party or parties, the president nonetheless is traditionally expected to refrain from being an active member of any party after assuming office. Every president to date, except Joachim Gauck (who was an independent), has suspended his party membership for the duration of his term. Presidents have, however, spoken publicly about their personal views on political matters. The very fact that a president is expected to remain above politics usually means that when he does speak out on an issue, it is considered to be of great importance.  In some cases, a presidential speech has dominated German political debate for a year or more.

Reserve powers 
According to article 81 of the German constitution, the president can declare a "Legislation Emergency" and allow the federal government and the Bundesrat to enact laws without the approval of the Bundestag. He also has important decisive power regarding the appointment of a chancellor who was elected by plurality only, or the dissolution of the Bundestag under certain circumstances.

It is also theoretically possible, albeit a drastic step which has not happened since 1949, that the president refuses to sign legislation merely because he disagrees with its content, thus vetoing it, or refuse to approve a cabinet appointment. In all cases in which a bill was not signed by the federal president, all presidents have claimed that the bill in question was manifestly unconstitutional. For example, in the autumn of 2006, President Horst Köhler did so twice within three months. Also, in some cases, a president has signed a law while asking that the political parties refer the case to the Federal Constitutional Court in order to test the law's constitutionality.

Succession 

The Basic Law did not create an office of Vice President, but designated the President of the Bundesrat (by constitutional custom the head of government of one of the sixteen German states, elected by the Bundesrat in a predetermined order of annual alternation) as deputy of the president of Germany (Basic Law, Article 57). If the office of president falls vacant, they assume the powers of the president on an acting basis until a successor is elected. While doing so, they do not continue to exercise the role of chair of the Bundesrat. If the president is temporarily unable to perform his duties (this happens frequently, for example if the president is abroad on a state visit), he can at his own discretion delegate his powers or parts of them to the president of the Bundesrat. For example, current President of the Bundesrat Peter Tschentscher deputised President Steinmeier when the latter was on a trip to Asia in early November 2022.

If the president dies in office, resigns or is otherwise removed from office, a successor is to be elected within thirty days. Horst Köhler, upon his resignation on 31 May 2010, became the first president to trigger this re-election process. Jens Böhrnsen, President of the Senate and Mayor of the Free Hanseatic City of Bremen and at the time President of the Bundesrat, became Acting President. Similarly, when Christian Wulff resigned in 2012, it was Horst Seehofer, Minister-President of Bavaria, as President of the Bundesrat, who became Acting President. When Heinrich Lübke, on the other hand, announced his resignation in 1968, it only came into effect the following year, a mere three months before the scheduled end of his term and after the expedited election of his successor. Back in 1949, Karl Arnold, at the time Minister-President of North Rhine-Westphalia and President of the Bundesrat, also acted as head of state for a few days: after the Basic Law had come into effect and he himself was elected as President of the Bundesrat, the first President of Germany was not yet elected and the office therefore vacant.

None of these three presidents of the Bundesrat acting as President, has used any of the more important powers of the president, as for example vetoing a law or dissolving the Bundestag, although they would have been entitled to do so under the same conditions as the president.

Impeachment and removal 
While in office, the president enjoys immunity from prosecution and cannot be voted out of office or recalled. The only mechanism for removing the president is impeachment by the Bundestag or Bundesrat for willfully violating German law. In either of the two bodies a two-thirds majority is required. Once the Bundestag or the Bundesrat impeaches the president, the Federal Constitutional Court is charged with determining if they are guilty of the offence. If the charge is sustained, the court has the authority to remove the president from office.

Presidential office and symbols

Residences and office 

The official residence of the president is Bellevue Palace in Berlin. The president's second official residence is the Hammerschmidt Villa in Bonn, the former capital city of West Germany.

Although these are the president's official residences, he does not live in Bellevue palace. Instead, it is only used as a ceremonial office. The president and his wife live in a villa in Dahlem which is part of the Berlin borough of Steglitz-Zehlendorf.

The Office of the President (Bundespräsidialamt) is a supreme federal authority. It organises the president's work, supports the president in the performance of his duties as head of state and coordinates his working relationships with other parts of the German government and administration. Its top official, who takes precedence over all other German state secretaries, is the Head of the Office of the President (Chef des Bundespräsidialamts).

The office and its staff advise the president, informs them of all developments in domestic and foreign affairs and carries out the instructions of the president or forwards these to the corresponding ministry or authority.

Transportation 

The president's car is usually black, made in Germany and has the numberplate "0 – 1" with the presidential standard on the right wing of the car. The president also uses a VIP helicopter operated by the Federal Police and VIP aircraft (Bombardier Global 5000, Airbus A319CJ, Airbus A310 or A340) operated by the Executive Transport Wing of the German Air Force. When the president is on board, the flight's callsign is "German Airforce 001".

Presidential standard 

The standard of the president of Germany was adopted on 11 April 1921, and used in this design until 1933. A slightly modified version also existed from 1926, that was used in addition to the 1921 version. In 1933, these versions were both replaced by another modified version, that was used until 1935.

The Weimar-era presidential standard from 1921 was adopted again as presidential standard by a decision by President Theodor Heuss on 20 January 1950, when he also formally adopted other Weimar-era state symbols including the coat of arms. The eagle (Reichsadler, now called Bundesadler) in the design that was used in the coat of arms and presidential standard in the Weimar Republic and today was originally introduced by a decision by President Friedrich Ebert on 11 November 1919.

The standard is flown on Bellevue palace when the president is in the official residence in Berlin or travelling in another part of Germany. It is taken down only when the president resides at Villa Hammerschmidt in Bonn, if they have designated another place in Germany as their official residence, or when they're abroad.

History 
The modern-day position of German president is significantly different from the Reich President of the Weimar Republic – a position which held considerable power and was regarded as an important figure in political life.

Weimar Republic 

The position of President of Germany was first established by the Weimar Constitution, which was drafted in the aftermath of World War I and the abdication of Emperor Wilhelm II in 1918. In Germany the new head of state was called the Reichspräsident.

Friedrich Ebert (SPD) served as Germany's first president, followed by Paul von Hindenburg. The office effectively came to an end upon Hindenburg's death in 1934 and its powers merged with those of the chancellor. Adolf Hitler now ruled Germany as "Führer und Reichskanzler", combining his previous positions in party and government. However, he did officially become president; the office was not abolished (though the constitutionally mandated presidential elections every seven years did not take place in the Nazi era) and briefly revived at the end of the Second World War when Hitler appointed Grand Admiral Karl Dönitz as his successor as "President of Germany". Dönitz agreed to the surrender to the Allies and was arrested a few days later.

The Weimar Constitution created a semi-presidential system in which power was divided between the president, a cabinet and a parliament. The president enjoyed far greater power than the current president and had an active political role, rather than a largely ceremonial one. The influence of the president also increased greatly as a result of the instability of the Weimar period. The president had authority to appoint the chancellor and could dismiss the entire cabinet at any time. However, it was also necessary for the cabinet to enjoy the confidence of the Reichstag (parliament) because it could be removed by a vote of no confidence. All bills had to receive the signature of the president to become law and, although he did not have an absolute veto on legislation, he could insist that a law be submitted for the approval of voters in a referendum. The president also had authority to dissolve the Reichstag, conduct foreign affairs, and command the armed forces. Article 48 of the constitution also provided the president sweeping powers in case of a crisis. If there was a threat to "public order and security" he could legislate by decree and suspend civil rights.

The Weimar constitution provided that the president be directly elected and serve a seven-year term. The election involved a form of the two-round system. However the first president was elected by the National Assembly and subsequently only two direct presidential elections actually occurred. These were the election of Paul von Hindenburg in 1925 and his re-election in 1932.

The system created by the Weimar constitution led to a number of problems. In particular, the fact that the president could appoint the cabinet, while the Reichstag had only a power of dismissal, created a high cabinet turn-over as ministers were appointed by the president only to be dismissed by the Reichstag shortly afterwards. Eventually Hindenburg stopped trying to appoint cabinets that enjoyed the confidence of the Reichstag and ruled by means of three "presidential cabinets" (Präsidialkabinette). Hindenburg was also able to use his power of dissolution to by-pass the Reichstag. If the Reichstag threatened to censure his ministers or revoke one of his decrees he could simply dissolve the body and be able to govern without its interference until elections had been held. This led to eight Reichstag elections taking place in the 14 years of the Republic's existence; only one parliamentary term, that of 1920–1924, was completed without elections being held early.

German Democratic Republic ("East Germany") 

The German Democratic Republic established the office of a head of state with the title of President of the Republic (German: Präsident der Republik) in 1949, but abandoned the office with the death of the first president, Wilhelm Pieck, in 1960 in favour of a collective head of state closely modeled on its Soviet counterpart. All government positions of the country, including the presidency, were appointed by the ruling Socialist Unity Party of Germany on the approval of the Communist Party of the Soviet Union.
Following the end of communist rule due to the Peaceful Revolution, the head of state became the parliamentary speaker with new, fair elections. Later that year, a draft constitution was written that would have restored the presidency, but ultimately this never materialized.

Federal Republic of Germany ("West Germany", 1949–1990) 
With the promulgation of the Grundgesetz  in 1949, the office of President of the Federal Republic (in German: Bundespräsident) was created in West Germany.  Partly due to the misuse of presidential powers in the Weimar Republic, the office's powers were significantly reduced.  Not only is he indirectly elected, but most of the real power was transferred to the chancellor.

Because the reunification of Germany in 1990 was accomplished by the five East German states joining the Federal Republic, the president became the president of all German states without the establishment of a new presidential office.

List of presidents 

Twelve persons have served as President of the Federal Republic of Germany. Six of them were members of the CDU (Lübke, Carstens, von Weizsäcker, Herzog, Köhler, Wulff), three were members of the SPD (Heinemann, Rau, Steinmeier), two were members of the FDP (Heuss, Scheel) and one was an Independent (Gauck). Four presidents were ministers in the federal government before entering office (Lübke Agriculture, Heinemann Justice, Scheel, Steinmeier Foreign Affairs), two of them (Scheel, Steinmeier) having been Vice-Chancellor of Germany. Three were head of a state government (von Weizsäcker West Berlin, Rau North Rhine-Westphalia, Wulff Lower Saxony), Rau having been President of the Bundesrat. Two were members of the Bundestag (Heuss, Carstens), Carstens having been President of the Bundestag. One was president of the Federal Constitutional Court (Herzog), director of the IMF (Köhler) and Federal Commissioner for the Stasi Records (Gauck). Only five presidents (Heuss, Lübke, von Weizsäcker, Köhler, Steinmeier) have been re-elected for a second five-year-term and only two of those (Heuss, von Weizsäcker) served the full ten years. Christian Wulff served the shortest tenure (1 year, 7 months and 18 days) of all presidents.

The president is (according to Art. 57 GG) deputised by the president of the Bundesrat who can perform any of the president's duties, if the president is temporarily unable to do so and delegates these duties to them (this frequently happens during state visits), or if the Presidency falls vacant, in which case he becomes acting President until a successor is elected, which has to happen within thirty days. This has happened three times:
In 1949, Karl Arnold acted as President after the Grundgesetz came into effect on 7 September 1949 and before Theodor Heuss was elected by the 1st Federal Convention on 12 September 1949.
In 2010, Jens Böhrnsen acted as President after the resignation of Horst Köhler and before the election of Christian Wulff. 
In 2012, Horst Seehofer acted as President after the resignation of Christian Wulff and before the election of Joachim Gauck.

See also 
President of Germany (1919–1945)
Air transports of heads of state and government
Official state car

References

External links 

 
Germany: Heads of State: 1949–2022

Lists of political office-holders in Germany
Germany, President of
 
Germany
1949 establishments in Germany